Route 73 is a  east–west highway on the Avalon Peninsula of Newfoundland. It connects the towns of New Harbour and Spaniard's Bay via Tilton and Route 70. The majority of Route 73 is known as New Harbour Road, except within the town limits of Spaniard's Bay, where it is known as Back Track Road.

Route description

Route 73 begins at an intersection with Route 80 (Trinity Road) in the easternmost part of New Harbour. It heads east through rural wooded terrain for several miles to enter the Spaniard's Bay town limits, and Tilton, to have an interchange with Route 75 (Veterans Memorial Highway). The highway passes through neighbourhoods before coming to an end at an intersection with Route 70 (Conception Bay Highway).

Major intersections

References

073